Yagatako-ike is an earthfill dam located in Fukuoka Prefecture in Japan. The dam is used for irrigation. The catchment area of the dam is  km2. The dam impounds about 7  ha of land when full and can store 610 thousand cubic meters of water. The construction of the dam was completed in 1959.

References

Dams in Fukuoka Prefecture
1959 establishments in Japan